Simon Van Vossel (born 28 February 1979) is a Belgian short track speed skater. He competed in three events at the 2002 Winter Olympics.

References

1979 births
Living people
Belgian male short track speed skaters
Olympic short track speed skaters of Belgium
Short track speed skaters at the 2002 Winter Olympics
Sportspeople from Ghent